Pang Kum-chol (born November 11, 1981) is a North Korean weightlifter who competes in the 77 kg weight category. Pang won a gold medal at the 2010 Asian Games, at the 2009 Asian Weightlifting Championships (two silvers and one bronze); a medals count repeated at the 2011 Asian Weightlifting Championships.

Pang represents the Kigwancha Sports Team.

References

External links
Pang Kum Chol biography at gz2010.cn (official website of the 2010 Asian Games)

1981 births
Living people
North Korean male weightlifters
Asian Games medalists in weightlifting
Weightlifters at the 2010 Asian Games
Asian Games gold medalists for North Korea
Medalists at the 2010 Asian Games
21st-century North Korean people